Mary Ann Sorden Stuart (February 12, 1828 – April 19, 1893) was an American suffragist who served as a representative of the women's suffrage movement from Delaware and attended the National Woman Suffrage Association conventions in Washington, DC.

Early life 
Mary Ann Sorden Stuart was born on February 12, 1828, to John Sorden and Sarah Owens Pennewill Sorden in Sussex County, Delaware.

Activism 
Stuart organized the first women's suffrage group in Wilmington, Delaware, in 1869. Stuart spoke in favor of women's suffrage in front of the United States Senate Judiciary Committee in 1878. She also became the Delaware representative to the National Woman Suffrage Association (NWSA). Stuart also testified to the Delaware General Assembly in 1881 on allowing women's suffrage in the state constitution.

References 

American women's rights activists
1828 births
1893 deaths
People from Greenwood, Delaware
American suffragists